The Ambassador Extraordinary and Plenipotentiary of the Russian Federation to the Republic of Armenia is the official representative of the President and the Government of the Russian Federation to the President and the Government of Armenia.

The ambassador and his staff work at large in the Embassy of Russia in Yerevan. There is a Consulate General in Gyumri.

History of diplomatic relations

Diplomatic relations were briefly established between the Russian Soviet Federative Socialist Republic and the Democratic Republic of Armenia in 1920. Boris Legran was the Russian representative between 28 July and  29 November 1920, prior to the Armenian republic's conquest by Soviet forces and its 1922 amalgamation into the Transcaucasian Socialist Federative Soviet Republic. With the dissolution of the Soviet Union in 1991, the Republic of Armenia was established as an independent country, with diplomatic relations established with the Russian Federation on 3 April 1992.

Representatives

Representatives of the Russian Soviet Federative Socialist Republic to the Democratic Republic of Armenia (1920)

Representatives of the Russian Federation to Armenia (1992 – present)

References

 
Armenia
Russia